Cubalaskeya machoi is a species of sea snail, a gastropod in the family Cerithiopsidae. It was described by Espinosa, Ortea and Moro, in 2008.

References

Cerithiopsidae
Gastropods described in 2008